Stenobothrus lineatus is usually called the stripe-winged grasshopper: it is a species of grasshoppers (Orthoptera: Caelifera) in the family Acrididae.

Subspecies
Two subspecies are recorded:
 S. l. lineatus
 S. l. flavotibialis

Gallery

References

External links
 
 

Orthoptera of Europe
lineatus